César Rougé (born 3 October 2002) is a French professional rugby league footballer who plays as a  or  for the Catalans Dragons in the Super League and France at international level.

In 2021 he made his Catalans debut in the Super League against St Helens.

References

External links
Catalans Dragons profile
France profile
French profile

2002 births
Living people
Catalans Dragons players
France national rugby league team players
French rugby league players
Rugby league hookers
Rugby league halfbacks
Rugby league five-eighths
Whitehaven R.L.F.C. players